"Let's Impeach the President" is a protest song written, produced and recorded by Neil Young. It is the seventh track on his 2006 studio album Living with War.

It starts off with a trumpet playing the first six notes of "Taps", followed by a chorus singing about various reasons to impeach then-President of the United States George W. Bush. The song features sound clips from the president's speeches.

Young attempted to "trick" Stephen Colbert (who was then in character) into playing the song on his August 17, 2006, appearance on The Colbert Report.

See also 
 Efforts to impeach George W. Bush
 "Impeach the President", a 1973 protest song advocating the impeachment of President Richard Nixon by The Honey Drippers
 List of anti-war songs

2006 songs
Neil Young songs
Protest songs
Songs written by Neil Young
Songs about George W. Bush
Song recordings produced by Neil Young
Song recordings produced by Niko Bolas
Reprise Records singles
Presidential impeachment in the United States